Someone like You is a 2001 American romantic comedy film directed by Tony Goldwyn, based on Laura Zigman's 1998 novel Animal Husbandry. The film stars Ashley Judd, Greg Kinnear, Hugh Jackman, Marisa Tomei, and Ellen Barkin, and follows a heartbroken woman looking for a reason why she was dumped.

Plot
Jane Goodale voices over the images of a scientific experiment where a bull would not mount a cow twice, not even if her scent is changed. Until recently, she believed men are all like the bull, but she discovers it is not always true.

Jane is a production assistant for a recently syndicated talk show, so host Diane Roberts who wants to be the best, is always looking for ungettable guests, like Fidel Castro. Eddie Alden is the producer and a womanizer, much to Jane's amicable critique.

Eddie needs a roommate, but disgruntled exes keep damaging his bulletin board posters. Offering Jane the room, she turns down vehemently. Jane is immediately smitten when she meets the new producer of the show, Ray Brown. She tells her friend Liz and discusses her bad luck with men. Meanwhile, her sister goes on fertility treatments. Ray calls Jane, they spend an evening together and end up kissing. The next morning she calls Liz, ecstatic. Liz gives her advice on Ray and his girlfriend Dee (with whom he has trouble). Ray and Jane seem to be very much in love.

The relationship evolves, and they decide to move in together. Jane puts in notice to her landlord; when Ray tells his girlfriend it is over, he does not mention the new woman in his life. Distancing himself from Jane while she is packing to move, he breaks it off over dinner, leaving her in tears. The next morning in the office Jane takes her revenge by announcing to move in with Eddie. She learns to deal with the many women in Eddie's life and they bond over scotch and leftovers. Reading an article about the old cow syndrome, she starts researching for her theory of men. Liz works at a men's magazine and proposes Jane write a column about her theory, under the pen name Dr. Marie Charles.

The column, dealing with men's insecurity and dishonesty, is a big hit. Everybody wants to meet Dr. Charles, including Diane. At a Christmas party, Ray tells her he misses her, asking her out for New Year's Eve, but stands her up. When Jane shows up at a party looking for Eddie at midnight, she can't find him and leaves in tears. He spots her across the crowded room, tries to go after her but can't reach her. Back at the office, Ray tries to apologize, but Diane interrupts wearing the shirt Jane bought for Ray.

Diane is "Dee," and Ray is back with her. As the board meeting is about to start, Eddie makes sure Jane isn't crying going in, but she acts strangely, so he covers for her. When Ray gets emotional talking about a Gérard Depardieu movie, Jane spills her guts over his inability to show empathy for her broken heart. After the meeting Diane, unaware of Jane's relationship with Ray, gives her advice on how to win her boyfriend back, telling her how she did it.

At a bar, Liz follows Dr. Charles's advice and is not going to fall for the same kind of guy anymore. Jane and Eddie argue over Dr. Charles' advice. At home she tells him she has to believe the theory because otherwise she is fears men don't leave women - they leave her. Eddie comforts her saying Ray is not the last man she'll ever love, and they fall asleep together. The next morning he wakes up happy and comfortable while Jane freaks out. He suggests she not overanalyse it, saying he is happy they slept the whole night together without it leading to sex.

Jane tells Eddie he will show his true colours and will hurt her soon. He tells her it is not about him, but her attitude is the problem. Jane gets a call from her brother-in-law telling her that her sister had a miscarriage. At the hospital she sees their true love and tells Diane that Dr. Charles will be on her show.

The interview is meant to be over the telephone, but Jane changes her mind mid-way and goes on the stage. She tells the audience that there is no Dr. Charles (we see Eddie leave at this point) and that the theory is ridiculous because she was hurt and needed to blame men for her pain. By this time Eddie is long gone. Jane goes after him and tells him she found new love. He doesn't answer, but kisses her passionately, to Van Morrison's "Someone like You" playing in the background.

Cast

 Ashley Judd as Jane Goodale, a television show producer who researches love and the problems men have with giving it
 Greg Kinnear as Ray Brown, Jane's ex-boyfriend and the show's executive producer
 Hugh Jackman as Eddie Alden, Jane's womanizing coworker and roommate
 Marisa Tomei as Liz, Jane's best friend
 Ellen Barkin as Diane Roberts, the star talent of Jane's show
 Catherine Dent as Alice, Jane's sister
 Peter Friedman as Stephen, Alice's husband
 Laura Regan as Evelyn
 Donna Hanover as Mary Lou Corkle
 Nicole Leach as Nia
 Colleen Camp as Realtor
 Julie Kavner as Furry Animal (voice)
 Sabine Singh as Girl in Bar
 Shuler Hensley as Hick Farmer
 Mireille Enos as Yoga Instructor #1
 Veronica Webb as herself
 Naomi Judd as Makeup Artist
 Hugh Downs as himself (uncredited)
 Tony Goldwyn as narrator on TV (uncredited)
 Chris Kerson as New Year's Eve Party Guest (uncredited)
 Krysten Ritter as Model (uncredited)

Reception

The film opened at No. 2 at the North American box office earning $10,010,600 in its opening weekend, behind Spy Kids. Overall the movie grossed over $38,689,940 worldwide.

Critical response

On Rotten Tomatoes the film has an approval rating of 42% based on reviews from 118 critics. The site's consensus was "A light and predictable, if somewhat shallow, romantic comedy that's easy to sit through because of the charming leads." On Metacritic it has a score of 32% based on reviews from 30 critics, indicating "generally unfavorable reviews". Audiences surveyed by CinemaScore gave the film a grade B on scale of A to F.

Peter Travers of Rolling Stone gave the film a positive review, saying "Judd shines like gold dust" and Jackman is "funny and touching" and "His scenes with the dazzling Judd have a poignancy that soars above the chick-flick herd into the realm of sweet magic."

Todd McCarthy of Variety called it "A romantic comedy as lamely generic as its title."

References

External links
 
 

2001 films
2001 romantic comedy films
20th Century Fox films
American romantic comedy films
Films about cattle
Films based on American novels
Films directed by Tony Goldwyn
Films produced by Lynda Obst
Films scored by Rolfe Kent
2000s English-language films
2000s American films